The Detroit Red Wings are a professional ice hockey team based in Detroit, Michigan. They are members of the Atlantic Division in the Eastern Conference of the National Hockey League (NHL) and are one of the Original Six teams of the League.

Key

Career and single season records

Individual

Team

Single game records

Individual

Team

Streaks

See also
Ice hockey statistics
List of NHL records (individual)
List of NHL records (team)
List of NHL statistical leaders

Notes
a. Chris Chelios, Mathieu Dandenault, Kris Draper, Steve Duchesne, Sergei Fedorov, Dominik Hasek, Tomas Holmstrom, Brett Hull, Nicklas Lidstrom, Kirk Maltby, Darren McCarty, Luc Robitaille, Brendan Shanahan, and Steve Yzerman in 2002, and Daniel Cleary, Valtteri Filppula, Johan Franzen, Darren Helm, Tomas Holmstrom, Marian Hossa, Jiri Hudler, Niklas Kronwall, Brett Lebda, Chris Osgood, Mikael Samuelsson, Brad Stuart and Henrik Zetterberg in 2009.
b. No Red Wings goaltender has ever been credited with a goal scored in the postseason
c. Minimum 25 games played
d. Minimum 7 games played
e. Active streak
f. March 3–21, 1951; February 27-March 20, 1955; December 12–31, 1995; March 3–22, 1996; October 13-November 1, 2005; October 25-November 14, 2006; October 18-November 9, 2007

References

External links 
 Detroit Red Wings official website

Records
records
National Hockey League statistical records